AFN Frankfurt was a radio station in Frankfurt, Germany, that was operational from 1945 to 2004. It was a part of the American Forces Network (AFN) broadcasting to US soldiers serving overseas, and long served as headquarters of AFN Europe. It was popular not just with soldiers, but also with a German "shadow audience", and was instrumental in introducing several American musical styles to German listeners.

History  

During World War II, the US military began establishing American Forces Network radio stations in Europe, starting in London on 4 July 1943. The AFN Frankfurt station first broadcast from a confiscated house in Frankfurt, on 15 July 1945. To soundproof the walls, staff used old Wehrmacht uniforms. When it was decided soon after to move the AFN headquarters for Europe to Frankfurt, a larger site became necessary, and the US military then requisitioned , a schloss dating back to the 14th century close in Höchst. The castle's owners, the von Brüning family, were given only a few hours to collect their belongings, but were promised to be able to return within 24 hours. AFN moved there in October 1946. The medieval tower was used to house the unmarried staff, with the newest member given the small top floor room. The headquarters stayed in Höchst until 1966, when they moved to the Dornbusch quarter of Frankfurt, next to the Broadcasting House Dornbusch, where the headquarters of Hessischer Rundfunk, the public broadcaster of the state of Hesse, are located. The Frankfurt site was shut down in 2004, when the headquarters of AFN Europe moved to Mannheim.

Content and scheduling 
In 1954, AFN Frankfurt sent thirteen hours of programming per day to the other stations in Europe, which would produce another six hours daily locally for a 06:00-01:00 program. A large part of the program originated in American commercial stations, but was stripped of commercials before broadcast on AFN. Because of the time difference, many sports events were recorded on tape to be re-broadcast at a more suitable local time. A fifteen-minute Report from Europe with European news was broadcast five days a week.
In 1986, the schedule had five minutes of news every hour on the hour.

Reception and influence  
AFN was popular in Germany for decades, not just with American military personnel. It had lasting importance, more than in other countries. Together with AFN Berlin and AFN Munich, AFN Frankfurt had many young German listeners and influenced also the programming of German radio stations. AFN was influential in returning jazz music to Germany, and AFN Frankfurt cooperated with  Radio Frankfurt (which would become the Hessischer Rundfunk). AFN Frankfurt organized their first jazz concert on 17 May 1945. Cooperation with the HR was instrumental in starting the Deutsches Jazzfestival in 1953. The program director Johnny Vrotsos also collaborated regularly with the German  jazz band. AFN was also instrumental in introducing blues, country, Western and rock and roll music to Germany. AFN Frankfurt has been credited with popularising rap and hip hop music in the local area.

In the 1960s, AFN was also highly respected for its news service, both among Americans and its "shadow audience" of Germans. It was estimated that about a million Germans listened to AFN once per week, roughly the same number of listeners as the Voice of America. However, the programming was deliberately not adapted to the shadow audience, and the military commanders were opposed to using the network as a tool for propaganda directed at Germans.

Transmitters and frequencies 
AFN Frankfurt was broadcast in AM on the 872 kHz frequency from the Weißkirchen radio transmitter, with a power of 150kW, three times the maximum power allowed in the United States. The frequency later changed to 873 kHz. In FM, the frequency was 98.7 MHz, broadcast from the Feldberg/Taunus transmitter.

Notable presenters 
The presenter Gary Bautell worked for AFN Frankfurt from 1962, where he hosted three different DJ programs, the music programs "The Dufflebag Show" and "Music in the Air" and the poetry and jazz program "Midnight in Europe".

See also 
 AFN Berlin
 AFN Bremerhaven
 AFN Munich

References

Bibliography

American Forces Network
English-language radio stations
Defunct radio stations in Germany
Mass media in Frankfurt
1945 establishments in Germany
2004 disestablishments in Germany
Radio stations established in 1945
Radio stations disestablished in 2004